The Fraunhofer Institute for Mechanics of Materials IWM in Freiburg, Germany, is a division of the Fraunhofer-Gesellschaft which focuses upon application-oriented research. The Fraunhofer IWM is a research and development partner for both industry and public institutions whose themes include the safety, reliability, life expectancy and functionality of materials in components and manufacturing processes. The broad spectrum of services offered by the Fraunhofer IWM's business units aid their clients and project partners in the assessment and continuing development of highly stressed materials and components and in the optimization of production process. Established in 1971 in Freiburg in Breisgau, the institute expanded in 1992 to include a location in Halle (Saale). On 1 January 2016 the Halle division of the Fraunhofer IWM became the Fraunhofer Institute for Microstructure of materials and Systems IMWS.

Competencies
Mechanics of Materials at the Fraunhofer IWM address all issues concerning functionality, behavior and the specific properties of materials from the development stage through manufacture, processing and application. Via the material-mechanical expertise of the scientists at the institute, the properties, functionality and stress limitations of materials and components are assessed, adjusted and improved as per specific requirements set forth by their clients. This in-depth know-how lies within situations in which complex and extreme load conditions exist for materials in components and manufacturing processes as well as in performance and efficiency improvements that can only be achieved through a holistic understanding of the various aspects involved. The interaction between experimentation and simulations yields solutions to materials-related issues for nearly all industry sectors.  The scientific, technical “tools” that make up the core competencies of the institute consist of:

Material and component characterization 

The Fraunhofer IWM characterizes and assesses material properties within components and production processes as well as the behavior of components across several scales and analyzes the development, manufacturing and application of materials and components and offers critical support by realizing new functionalities and processing steps.

Material modeling and simulation 

In order to derive the properties of materials from their internal structure, Fraunhofer IWM develops and uses mechanism-based material models. Such structure-property relationships can be used to influence the development of structures during manufacture and in use.

Tribology and surface design 

Stress and loads which affect the surfaces of components are analyzed and modified for optimal functionality and performance.

Research
Research and development activities at the Fraunhofer IWM are organized into five business units where similar project topics are grouped together in each unit. Pools of experts with the necessary competencies to achieve the desired goal are assembled from the various groups.

Manufacturing Processes 
A vast understanding of processes and sophisticated simulation techniques enables the design of efficient and safe manufacturing processes. Services include investigations into the technological development of manufacturing processes for the production of semi-finished products and components with functional properties. This work ranges from powder technology processes, including complex fluid systems, to microfluids, the forming and processing of ductile materials as well as processing techniques for brittle materials and glass forming.

Tribology 
This business unit carries out research into friction and wear. Tribological systems are optimized and solutions are developed  that reduce friction and protect against wear with the aid of technical ceramics, innovative lubricants, tribological layer systems and tribo-materials conditioned for manufacturing technology. Friction, abrasion, running-in and wear mechanisms are investigated as they affect the tribo-chemistry of machine elements such as roller and slide bearings, cutting and forming tools or motor and gear elements. Experimental techniques, multi-scale modeling and numerical simulations as well as microstructure analysis are employed.

Component Safety and Lightweight Construction 
This work is centered on the assessment of a component's safety and its fitness for purpose in terms of safety-relevant demands under operational loads. The applications range from proving the safety of power station components to confirming the fault tolerances of aerospace components, the life expectancy analysis of components in power stations and vehicles subjected to thermomechanical loads to crash analyses of vehicle components. The focus is on the operational behavior of modern materials as well as joins and hybrid constructions. Development work is also carried out on mechanism-based material models for a wide range of applications with which to describe the deformation and failure behavior of components under thermal and mechanical loads. Crash analysis increasingly involves determining the influence of the manufacturing process on the failure behavior of vehicle structures.

Assessment of Materials, Lifetime Concepts 
The influence of microstructures, internal stresses and damage on component functionality and life expectancy are assessed. Particular interest is paid to linking specific analyses and experiments with advanced material models as well as in understanding the demands placed on components. The work is focused on modeling cyclical thermomechanical loads and on identifying the degradation mechanisms involved in corrosion, stress corrosion cracking and hydrogen embrittlement. In acute cases of damage, the institute can carry out surveys.

Finances and staff 
The operating budget is financed through external earnings and institutional funding (core funding). The operating budget for 2021 amounted to 25.4 million euro, of which 27.8% came from industry revenues. The investment budget for 2021 was 4.4 million euro.

At the end of 2021 the institute employed 257 permanent staff: 142 scientists, 45 technical staff and 70 infrastructure staff. Including the 78 academic assistants which included interns as well as 10 apprentices, the Fraunhofer IWM had 345 employees in 2021.

References

External links 
 Official Website
 MicroTribology Centrum μTC
 Sustainability Center Freiburg
  Fraunhofer Materials and Components Group
 Department of Microsystems Engineering - IMTEK
 Albert-Ludwigs-University Freiburg Mathematics and Physics
 Karlsruher Institute for Applied Materials Computational Materials Science IAM-CMS

Fraunhofer Society
Materials science institutes
Scientific organizations established in 1971
1971 establishments in Germany